Siboney is a Cuban village and consejo popular (i.e.: people's council) located in the east of the city of Santiago de Cuba and belonging to its municipality.

Geography
The village lies by the Caribbean Sea, near the road linking Santiago to Baconao, through the eastern coastal area of Santiago municipality.

History

In 1898 Siboney and the nearby village of Daiquirí were locations where American forces came ashore in the Spanish–American War. The World War I transport ship  was named for this town, as was the escort carrier USS Siboney (CVE-112).

Siboney was also the location of a farm where Fidel Castro and his men gathered shortly before the attack on the Moncada Barracks, which is widely regarded as the start of the Cuban Revolution.

Personalities
Compay Segundo (1907–2003), musician

See also
El Caney
El Cobre
Siboney (song)

References

External links

Populated places in Santiago de Cuba Province
Santiago de Cuba
Spanish–American War